Patrick McGilligan may refer to:

 Patrick McGilligan (Fine Gael politician) (1889-1979), Irish politician who served as Attorney General of Ireland from 1954 to 1957 as well as several ministerial positions
 Patrick McGilligan (Irish nationalist politician) (1847–1917), Irish politician, MP for South Fermanagh from 1892 until 1895
 Patrick McGilligan (biographer) (born 1951), Irish American biographer